Linda Gren  (born 12 November 1974) is a Swedish women's international footballer who plays as a midfielder. She is a member of the Sweden women's national football team. She was part of the team at the 1999 FIFA Women's World Cup.

References

1974 births
Living people
Swedish women's footballers
Sweden women's international footballers
Place of birth missing (living people)
1999 FIFA Women's World Cup players
Women's association football midfielders